A Victory For Common Sense is the eighth and final studio album by the British rock group Stackridge. It was released in the UK by Helium Records in 2009.

Critical reception

Andy Gill of The Independent said, "The reformed group's new album finds their strengths and weaknesses in full supply, notably their air of whimsical Englishness. Several tracks reflect a wistful sense of lost heritage comparable to The Kinks Are the Village Green Preservation Society." He noted that the album had more of a 1980s sounds to it, but that the latter half of the album featured "the kind of unfocused meanderings that rendered prog-rock old".

Track listing 

 "Boots And Shoes" (Andy Davis, James Warren) – 4:06
 "The Old Country" (Davis, Warren, Mutter Slater, Crun Walter) – 3:17
 "(Waiting For You And) England To Return" (Warren, Davis, Glenn Tommey, Slater) – 4:05
 "Red Squirrel" (Davis) – 5:44
 "North St Grande" (Slater, Davis) – 3:45
 "Long Dark River" (Walter) – 7:15
 "Lost And Found" (Davis, Warren, Tommey) – 4:39
 "Cheese And Ham" (Davis, Warren, Tommey, Slater) – 5:55
 "The Day The World Stopped Turning" (Davis, Warren, Tommey) – 11:05

Personnel
Band
 Andy Davis : guitars, vocals, keyboards
 James Warren : guitars, vocals, bass
 Mike "Mutter" Slater : flute, vocals, acoustic guitar
 Jim "Crun" Walter : bass, acoustic guitar

Additional personnel
 Glenn Tommey : keyboards, trombone, backing vocals
 Rachel Hall : violin
 Sarah Mitchell : violin, backing vocals
 Eddie John : drums
 Andy "Codge" Marsden : drums
 Mark Frith : programming
 Chris Hughes : percussion
 Davide Rossi : strings arrangements

Production
 Produced by Chris Hughes
 Recorded and Mixed by Mark Frith and Chris Hughes
 Recorded and Mixed at Ashley Manor, Wiltshire

References

External links
 Stackridge at heliumrecords.co.uk

Stackridge albums
2009 albums